The 1965 Asian Basketball Confederation Championship for Women were held in Seoul, South Korea.

Results

Final standing

Awards

References
 Results
 archive.fiba.com

1965
1965 in women's basketball
women
International  women's basketball competitions hosted by South Korea
B